David Montgomery (born June 7, 1997) is an American football running back for the Detroit Lions of the National Football League (NFL). He played college football at Iowa State.

High school career
Growing up in the Cincinnati, Ohio area, he is an Eagle Scout in addition to being a standout prep dual threat quarterback. Over his four-year career, he rushed for 6,666 yards and  91 touchdowns. In 2015, he was named the Division III Ohio Player of the Year as well as the Southwest District Offensive Player of the Year.  His senior season rushing total of 2,707 was good enough for the 21st best single season performance in Ohio high school history.  He posted seven 200-yard games and three 300-yard games, including one 373 yard performance.

Recruiting
Despite a record-breaking high school career, Montgomery was only lightly recruited to continue his football career in college. He was only recruited by Miami (OH), Ball State, Buffalo, and Iowa State. He eventually committed to the Cyclones.

College career

2016 season
As a true freshman in 2016, Montgomery played in all 12 games and started the final four contests. He led the team in rushing with 563 yards, averaging 5.2 yards per carry.  This was good enough to be the second-best freshman performance in school history. In his second career start he rushed 169 yards on 24 carries to defeat Kansas. He was named Big 12 Newcomer of the Week for that performance. He finished the season with 141 yards rushing and 45 yards receiving against West Virginia.

At the conclusion of the season Montgomery was named to the honorable mention Freshman All-America team by Campus Insiders.

2017 season
Montgomery's break out season was in 2017.  He led the Cyclones in rushing yards and yards from scrimmage with 1,095 and 1,383 respectively. He finished second in the Big 12 in rushing yards and touchdowns behind only Justice Hill. Montgomery led the nation in forced missed tackles with 104, breaking the previous record of 89 set by Dalvin Cook. Against Iowa he ran for 113 yards, rushed for a touchdown, and had 53 yards on receptions. In an upset win at #3 Oklahoma, Montgomery ran for 55 yards and a touchdown and caught 7 passes for 89 yards. He had a career day against Texas Tech rushing for 164 yards on 28 attempts, averaging 5.9 yards per play. Montgomery had a three straight 100 yard performances against West Virginia, Oklahoma State, and Baylor with 115, 105, and 144 yards respectively including three touchdowns against the Cowboys.

Montgomery received multiple accolades at the end of the regular season.  He was named a first-team All-American by Pro Football Focus as well as consensus first-team All-Big 12.

2018 season
Montgomery started the season slow, but had a string of four straight 100-yard games with five touchdowns from mid-September to mid-October, and ended the season with another string of three straight 100-yard games with six touchdowns, including 179 yards from scrimmage in the 2018 Alamo Bowl loss to Washington State. Montgomery finished the 2018 season with 1,216 rushing yards (second in the Big 12 to Alex Barnes) and 13 rushing touchdowns (second to Sam Ehlinger).

College statistics

Professional career

Chicago Bears
On January 7, 2019, Montgomery announced that he would forgo his final season of eligibility and declare for the 2019 NFL Draft. ESPN2 dubbed Montgomery the "Frankenstein" of running backs for possessing similar physical traits of different NFL running backs, including the footwork of Saquon Barkley, the field vision of Le'Veon Bell, the strength of Ezekiel Elliott and the athleticism of Sony Michel. The Chicago Bears drafted Montgomery in the third round with the 73rd overall pick in the draft. Montgomery signed a four-year rookie contract with the team on June 14.

2019 season

Montgomery made his NFL debut with the Chicago Bears in Week 1 against the Green Bay Packers. In that game, Montgomery rushed for 18 yards on six attempts and caught one pass for 27 yards as the Bears lost 10–3. In Week 2 against the Denver Broncos, Montgomery rushed 18 times for 62 yards and his first career NFL touchdown as the Bears won 16–14. Though utilized more than teammate Tarik Cohen, Montgomery failed to reach 70 yards in any of the Bears' first seven games. After 11 carries for 25 yards in Week 6 and a disastrous two rushes for six yards and a fumble in Week 7 against the New Orleans Saints, Montgomery responded in Week 8 against the Los Angeles Chargers with 27 rushes for an NFL-second best 135 yards and a touchdown in the 17–16 loss. In Week 9 against the Philadelphia Eagles, Montgomery rushed 14 times for 40 yards and two touchdowns in the 22–14 loss. This was Montgomery's first game with multiple rushing touchdowns of his career. In Week 17 against the Minnesota Vikings, Montgomery rushed 23 times for 113 yards and a touchdown during the 21–19 win. Overall, Montgomery finished his rookie season with 889 rushing yards and six rushing touchdowns to go along with 25 receptions for 185 receiving yards and one receiving touchdown.

2020 season
Montgomery remained the team's featured running back heading into the 2020 season. Before the regular season began, head coach Matt Nagy emphasized the offense would prioritize establishing a run game.

He opened the season with 64 rushing yards on 13 attempts en route to a 27–23 comeback win against the Detroit Lions.  In Week 2 against the New York Giants, Montgomery rushed 16 times for 82 yards and caught three passes for 45 yards and his first receiving touchdown of the season during the 17–13 win.

Montgomery suffered a concussion during the Bears' Week 9 loss to the Tennessee Titans. He subsequently missed the team's Week 10 contest while recovering. The Bears rushing attack ranked last in the NFL with 82.3 yards-per-game at this point in the season. Nagy handed over play-calling responsibilities to offensive coordinator Bill Lazor. Montgomery returned for the Bears' Week 12 match-up against the Green Bay Packers on Sunday Night Football, where he totaled 143 yards from scrimmage and recorded a receiving touchdown in a 41–25 loss. In his second game back from the concussion, Montgomery rushed for 72 yards with two rushing touchdowns during a 34–30 loss against the Detroit Lions.

In Week 14 against the Houston Texans, he amassed 113 rushing yards, including an 80-yard touchdown run on the first play of the Bears' opening offensive possession. The score was the fourth-longest run in Bears history and the team's first opening-play touchdown since 1995. Montgomery finished the game with 155 yards from scrimmage in a 36–7 victory over the Houston Texans. During the Bears' 33–27 Week 15 victory over the Minnesota Vikings, Montgomery rushed for a career-high 146 yards with two touchdowns on 32 carries. The following week against the Jacksonville Jaguars, he ran for 95 yards and a touchdown during the 41–17 win as he surpassed 1,000 rushing yards for the season, becoming the first Bears running back to do so since Jordan Howard in 2017. In Week 17 against the Green Bay Packers, Montgomery recorded 132 yards from scrimmage and a rushing touchdown during the 35–16 loss.

Montgomery finished the 2020 regular season with 247 rushes for 1,070 yards and eight touchdowns. His 1,070 rushing yards ranked fifth in the NFL. He also caught 54 passes for 438 yards and two touchdowns.

2021 season
Montgomery recorded 309 rushing yards on 69 carries with three rushing touchdowns through first four games of the 2021 NFL season. He suffered a knee sprain in Week 4 against the Detroit Lions.  and was placed on injured reserve on October 9, 2021, and was expected to miss 4-5 weeks. He had the fifth most rushing yards in the league until his injury. He was activated on November 8 for the team's Week 9 game. In Week 17, against the New York Giants, he had two rushing touchdowns in the 29–3 victory. He finished the 2021 season with 225 carries for	849 rushing yards and seven rushing touchdowns to go along with 42 receptions for 301 receiving yards. He was ranked 98th by his fellow players on the NFL Top 100 Players of 2022.

2022 season
In Week 2, against the Green Bay Packers, Montgomery had 15 carries for 122 rushing yards in the 27–10 loss. In week 10 against the Atlanta Falcons, he had 121 combined yards (67 rushing, 54 receiving), and 1 touchdown on the ground in the 27-24 loss.

Detroit Lions
On March 16, 2023, Montgomery signed a three-year, $18 million contract with the Detroit Lions.

NFL career statistics

Personal life
Montgomery had a difficult childhood. He does not know his father, and his mother moved the family numerous times around Cincinnati due to economic hardship. He remembers using the oven for heat, and boiling water collected from gas stations in the bath tub when either was disconnected. He has a brother who was incarcerated for drug trafficking and murder. After scoring a touchdown, Montgomery frequently holds up a "V"-sign in memory of a high school teammate and role model who was murdered during a home invasion.

While he was with Iowa State, Montgomery was chosen as a semi-finalist for the Jason Witten Collegiate Man of the Year Award for his efforts in befriending Hunter Erb, a 6-year-old who was born with multiple congenital heart defects, and orchestrating a team visit to Marshalltown, Iowa to help clean up after a tornado.

Montgomery and his girlfriend had their first child, a boy, delivered on January 13, 2023.

References

External links

 Chicago Bears bio
 Iowa State Cyclones bio

1997 births
Living people
Players of American football from Cincinnati
American football running backs
Iowa State Cyclones football players
Chicago Bears players
Brian Piccolo Award winners
Detroit Lions players